is a Tokyo Kyuko Electric Railway Ikegami Line station in Ōta, Tokyo. It is close to Ikegami Honmon-ji.

Station layout 

Two ground-level side platforms.

Bus service 
 bus stop
Tokyu Bus
<井03> Kamata Sta. - Ikegami Sta. mae - Ikegami Garage - Ōmori Sta. - Ōimachi Sta.
<井09> Ikegami Sta. - Ikegami Garage - Ōmori Sta. - Ōimachi Sta.
<蒲15> Kamata Sta. - Ikegami Sta. mae - Ikegami Garage - Ebaracho Sta. Entrance
<森04> Ikegami Sta. mae - Ōmori Garage - Ōmori Sta. - Omori Garage
<森05> Senzoku-ike - Ikegami police station - Ikegami Sta. mae - Ikegami Garage - Omori Sta. - Omori Garage
<森06> Ōmori Sta. - Ikegami Garage - Ikegami Sta. mae - Magome Sta. mae - Omori Sta. (outer loop)
<森07> Ōmori Sta. - Magome Sta. mae - Ikegami Sta. mae - Ikegami Garage - Ōmori Sta. (inner loop)
<品94> Kamata Sta. - Ikegami Sta. mae - Ikegami Garage - Ōmori Sta. - Ōimachi Sta. - Shin-Baba Sta. - Shinagawa Sta.

History 
October 1922 Opened as a station of Ikegami Electric Railway.

External links 
  Ikegami Station  (Tokyu)  

Railway stations in Japan opened in 1922
Tokyu Ikegami Line
Stations of Tokyu Corporation
Railway stations in Tokyo